Pedro Blanco may refer to:

 Pedro Blanco (footballer) (born 1958), Colombian footballer
 Pedro Blanco (slave trader) (1795–1854), Spanish slave trader
 Pedro Antonio Blanco (1952–2000), lieutenant colonel of the Spanish Army
 Pedro Blanco López (1883–1919), Spanish pianist and academic
 Pedro Blanco Soto (1795–1829), President of Bolivia
 Pedro Blanco (Guangdong), a rock in the waters east of Hong Kong